Francesco Solari (c. 1415 – 1469) was an Italian sculptor, architect and engineer.

He was born in Milan, the son of Giovanni Solari and the brother of Guiniforte Solari.

Around 1445 he is known to be working in decorations for the church of the Villa in Castiglione Olona, the Duomo of Milan and the Certosa of Pavia, where Guiniforte was director of the works. Starting from 1460 he was master to Giovanni Antonio Amadeo.

He died in Milan in 1469.

1410s births
1469 deaths
15th-century Italian architects
15th-century Italian sculptors
Italian male sculptors
Engineers from Milan
Architects from Milan